Stonewall Jackson High School is a former high school in Kanawha County, West Virginia. It opened in 1940 and closed in 1989. It was located on the West Side in Charleston, West Virginia. In 1989, Stonewall Jackson High School and Charleston High School consolidated to become Capital High School. The building is now a middle school. 

It was named after the Civil War general Thomas "Stonewall" Jackson who was from Clarksburg, in what is now West Virginia. In August 2020, following the Black Lives Matter movement, Stonewall's name was removed from the school, which is now called West Side Middle School.

History 
In the late 1930s, Charleston High School became over-crowded so Stonewall Jackson High School was built in 1940 to accommodate the students on the West Side of Charleston. During the 1980s, the student populations at CHS and SJHS dropped. In 1989, Capital High School opened, combining the students of these two former schools. 

Charleston High School was torn down in mid 1989. Stonewall Jackson High School became Stonewall Jackson Junior High School that same year. A decade later, in 1999, Stonewall Jackson Junior High School became Stonewall Jackson Middle School. In August 2020, following the Black Lives Matter movement, the school was renamed West Side Middle School, part of a city-wide effort to remove memorials of Confederate soldiers. Along with Horace Mann Middle School, it is a feeder school for Capital High School.

References 

Pictorial History
Stonewall Jackson High School Class of 1977 Site

Defunct schools in West Virginia
Educational institutions disestablished in 1989
Educational institutions established in 1940
Charleston, West Virginia